Tamás Krivitz (born 29 September 1946) is a Hungarian football manager and former player.

References

1946 births
Living people
Hungarian footballers
Association football defenders
Bundesliga players
Újpest FC players
Vancouver Royals players
Kansas City Spurs players
Lierse S.K. players
Wuppertaler SV players
Hungarian football managers
Al-Salmiya SC managers
Kuwait Premier League managers
Hungarian expatriate footballers
Expatriate soccer players in Canada
Hungarian expatriate sportspeople in Canada
Expatriate soccer players in the United States
Hungarian expatriate sportspeople in the United States
Expatriate footballers in Belgium
Hungarian expatriate sportspeople in Belgium
Expatriate footballers in West Germany
Hungarian expatriate sportspeople in West Germany
Hungarian expatriate football managers
Expatriate football managers in Kuwait
Hungarian expatriate sportspeople in Kuwait
Expatriate football managers in Oman
Hungarian expatriate sportspeople in Oman
Sportspeople from Pécs